Jacob Horwitz (or Horowitz) (1830 – 24 March 1920) was a politician in Queensland, Australia. He was a Member of the Queensland Legislative Assembly.

Early life 
Horwitz was born in 1830 in East Prussia (now part of Poland). Together with his brother, he ran the Exchange Store general store in the town of Warwick, and owned the local Ellenthorpe Flour Mill.

Politics 
Horwitz began public life as Mayor of Warwick from 1876 to 1878. He resigned in 1878 to successfully contest the seat of Warwick in the Queensland Legislative Assembly. A member of the Liberal party, Horwitz was elected to the seat in 1878, defeating James Morgan who was dying from an injury sustained some months earlier. Horwitz served two terms as member for the district from 1878 to 1887. In February 1887, he embarked on a trip to Europe. Despite some pressure, he did not initially resign his seat in parliament;  but in June 1887 he sent a cablegram from London announcing his resignation. A by-election was held on 2 July 1887, which was won by Independent candidate Arthur Morgan (son of James Morgan) who later became Premier of Queensland.

Later life 
Horwitz was a prominent philanthropist in the Darling Downs region, including gifting £7500 to the Warwick General Hospital for the creation of a new ward.

He died in Berlin on 24 March 1920.

References

Members of the Queensland Legislative Assembly
1830 births
1920 deaths
People from East Prussia
German emigrants to Australia